Gordon Institute of Business Science (GIBS Business School) is a business school in South Africa and an affiliate of the University of Pretoria. It is located in the heart of Illovo, Johannesburg, close to the Sandton financial and commercial business hub. GIBS is accredited by the Council on Higher Education (CHE) and internationally by Association of MBAs (AMBA).

It is ranked as one of the best business schools in South Africa and the wider Africa, with flagship programmes that include the Masters in Business Administration (MBA), Postgraduate Diploma in Business Administration (PDBA), Doctor of Business Administration (DBA/PHD). In 2012, the GIBS DBA became the first South African doctoral programme in business to receive international accreditation from AMBA. GIBS also offers various Executive Programmes: short courses, executive level programmes like the Global Executive Development & General Management Programmes, company-specific programmes. Extended Programmes are longer certificate programmes and include the Social Entrepreneurship Programme, Leading Women Programme and Nexus Leadership Programme.

History and campus 
GIBS was established in January 2000 following a contribution by Sir Donald Gordon, the founder of Liberty Life and Liberty International, and a major investment by the University of Pretoria following discussions that started in 1998. The business school follows on the university's Graduate School of Management's long tradition of MBA tuition. Founded in 1949, the GSM MBA was the first MBA programme to be launched outside of North America. The GSM as of January 2008 was formally replaced by the Gordon Institute of Business Science.

GIBS is situated in a greenfield campus in the Illovo Boulevard, mixed-use commercial node between the suburbs of Rosebank and Sandton in Johannesburg, with a satellite inner city campus on Pritchard Street. Accommodation is provided on the Illovo campus by the on-campus Illovo Hotel. The Illovo campus is served by the Rosebank Gautrain station, with a nearby Gautrain bus stop and the inner city campus by the Johannesburg Park Station.

Sir Donald Gordon

Sir Donald Gordon (24 June 1930 – 21 November 2019) was a South African businessman and philanthropist. He was educated at King Edward VII School in Johannesburg before doing his articles to be a Chartered Accountant at the firm Kessel Feinstein (Now Grant Thornton). He founded the Liberty Life Association of Africa in 1957 out of which he formed Transatlantic Insurance Holdings plc, now Liberty International (Property portfolio of £6.2 billion (2009)) and Liberty Holdings Limited (Total assets of R449 billion (2011)). He was a co-founder of British company Abbey Life. In June 2005, he was awarded a British knighthood in recognition of his services to arts and business.

Rankings

Academics
In 2021, the school had 35 permanent faculty members, 29 adjunct faculty members, 11 international faculty members, 8 extraordinary professors and 1 honorary professor (80% of faculty members hold a doctorate). Past and present faculty members include Gill Marcus (ninth Governor of the South African Reserve Bank) and Nick Binedell.

Company-specific programmes clients include Standard Bank, Anglo American PLC, ABSA, SABMiller, United Nations Children's Fund (UNICEF) and the South African National Treasury. The company-specific programmes have been delivered in 22 countries and include the certificates in Senior Management Development, Wealth Management, Middle Management Development Programme and Foundation Management Development Programme.

References

 
Educational institutions established in 2000
Business schools in South Africa
2000 establishments in South Africa